Cosmic Kaleidoscope is a collection of science fiction short stories by Bob Shaw, published in 1976 by Gollancz in the UK and in 1977 by Doubleday in the US. It contains:

 "Skirmish on a Summer Morning"
 "Unreasonable Facsimile"
 "A Full Member of the Club"
 "The Silent Partners"
 "The Giaconda Caper"
 "An Uncomic Book Horror Story"
 "The Brink"
 "Waltz of the Bodysnatchers"
 "A Little Night Flying"

1976 short story collections
Short story collections by Bob Shaw
Victor Gollancz Ltd books